The 1930 Centenary Gentlemen football team was an American football team that represented the Centenary College of Louisiana as a member of the Southern Intercollegiate Athletic Association (SIAA) during the 1930 college football season. In their eighth year under head coach Homer Norton, the team compiled an 8–1–1 record.

Schedule

References

Centenary
Centenary Gentlemen football seasons
Centenary Gentlemen football